TPX may refer to:

TransPennine Express, a train operating company in the United Kingdom
Terminal Productivity Executive, a session manager for IBM mainframe computers
A trademark for Polymethylpentene plastic
Tension pneumothorax, a medical condition of hypoxia due to air accumulating under pressure between the lung and the chest wall